Innocentius Serpa, C.R.L. (1573 – August 1625) was a Roman Catholic prelate who served as Bishop of Pula (1624–1625).

Biography
Innocentius Serpa was born in Vicenza, Italy and ordained a priest in the Canons Regular of the Lateran.
On 12 February 1624, he was appointed by Pope Urban VIII as Bishop of Pula. 
On 18 February 1624, he was consecrated bishop by Pietro Valier, Bishop of Ceneda with Agostino Gradenigo, Bishop of Feltre, and Vincenzo Giustiniani (bishop), Bishop of Treviso, serving as co-consecrators. 
He served as Bishop of Pula until his death in August 1625.

References

External links and additional sources
 (for Chronology of Bishops) 
 (for Chronology of Bishops) 

17th-century Roman Catholic bishops in Croatia
1625 deaths
Bishops appointed by Pope Urban VIII
1573 births